Club Athletico Albion, C. A. Albion or simply CA Albion was a football club based in São Paulo, Brazil.
Founded in 1921 as Associação Athletica São Paulo Alpargatas, the name of the company where most of the team's players worked (São Paulo Alpargatas), and, in 1932, chose to change its name to Club Athletico Albion, and acted as such until 1936, when the club abandoned the Campeonato Paulista during the dispute and was dissolved. Their colors were red, blue and white. His main uniform was tricolor with narrow parallel vertical stripes, white shorts. It is currently extinct. 

In 2021, the club had recognized the title of state champion, won in 1933. However, nothing remains of the club nowadays.

Honours

Campeonato Paulista:
Winners (1): 1933 (FPF)
Campeonato Paulista Second Level:
Winners (3): 1931 (APEA), 1932 (APEA), 1935 (LPF)

References

Association football clubs established in 1921
1921 establishments in Brazil
Association football clubs disestablished in 1936
Defunct football clubs in São Paulo (state)